Park High School is a high school in Cottage Grove, Minnesota, United States, part of the South Washington County School District. The school was opened in 1914 In St. Paul Park, on 3rd St. It was moved to a newer building in Cottage Grove in 1965.

History
The school was originally opened in 1914 In St. Paul Park. It was later moved to Cottage Grove in 1965.
An ice arena was added and attached to the school in 1974. It was later disconnected from the school. In 2010, the high school ice arena next to the school had construction which added a new entrance and another full sized rink for another, newly built high school in the area. In 2011, the building underwent construction which added a lecture hall and a new modern looking entrance. The school's original mascot was the Indians, but in the mid 1990s it was changed to the Wolfpack, to avoid any perception of insensitivity toward Native Americans. In 2018, it was decided by the district to remove the Indian Mascot that had been in the floor since the current building was opened in 1965.

Academics
Park High School serves students living in Cottage Grove, St. Paul Park, Grey Cloud Island, and Denmark Township. Some students living outside of the attendance boundary opt to attend Park rather than their home school.

Park High School is an International Baccalaureate world school. It also offers 916 courses which can be used for college credits at select locations.

Athletics
Park High School is a member of the Minnesota State High School League. Their team name is the Wolfpack. They are a member of the Suburban East Conference

Park is commonly referred to as Park of Cottage Grove.

Sports at Park High School include:

	Soccer
	Cross Country (Running)
	Football
       Swimming
       Tennis
       Volleyball
	Alpine Skiing
       Basketball
       Dance Team
	Ice Hockey
	Gymnastics
	Nordic Skiing
	Wrestling
	Baseball
       Golf
	Lacrosse
	Softball
       Track & Field
       Bowling
       Cheerleading
       Clay Target

Notable alumni
Michael Birawer, artist
Derek Chauvin, former police officer convicted of the murder of George Floyd
Melissa Ferlaak, heavy metal singer
Sam Jacobson, NBA player
Kerry Ligtenberg, MLB player
Seann William Scott, actor

References

Park High School. International Baccalaureate World School. 10/20/14. 10/28/14. http://www.sowashco.k12.mn.us/phs/
South Washington County. District 833. (2013). 10/28/14. http://www.sowashco.k12.mn.us/

External links

1914 establishments in Minnesota
Educational institutions established in 1914
International Baccalaureate schools in Minnesota
Public high schools in Minnesota
Schools in Washington County, Minnesota